Rasche is a surname of German origin. Notable people with the surname include:

David Rasche, American actor
Karl Emil August Rasche, SS-Obersturmbannführer
Thea Rasche, German aviator

See also 
Rasch
 Rasch model, analysis tool
Raiche (disambiguation)

German-language surnames